This is a list of records in the sport of Track and Field at the Community College level in the United States.  The national governing body of athletics at that level is the National Junior College Athletic Association (NJCAA).  However, the California Community College system, the largest in the country with over 100 institutions, is not a member of the NJCAA, instead governing its sports through the unaffiliated California Community College Athletic Association (CCCAA).  Merging the records between these organizations has been left to the independent publication Track and Field News (T&FN) primarily in the person of Robert Hersh, who also supervises records for USA Track and Field (USATF).

Starting in the 1970s, many community colleges began recruiting foreign born athletes.  With some of the best athletes in the world competing against American college freshmen and sophomores, an additional set of records for the best American born athletes was also included.  T&FN was not 100% accurate when assessing which athletes are not Americans.  They were not given assistance by the colleges, who tended not to discuss the foreign roots of some of their recruits.  Additionally, with the less restrictive eligibility regulations (as compared to the very strict NCAA regulations), foreign born athletes could be older than the 18- to 20-year-old Americans who entered community college immediately following high school.

All of these records appear to be exclusively from Community College level competition, as opposed to the means T&FN uses in calculating High School records, where they allow all attempts by a high school affiliated athlete made against Open level competitors.

Men
   
Key:
      ' after name = non-U.S. citizen  (A) = altitude-aided mark--over 1000m of altitude (in affected events only)  i = made indoors (banked-track marks not acceptable)

Women

See also
 List of CCCAA Championship records in track and field

References
General
T&FN Men's Junior College Records
 T&FN Women's Junior College Records
Specific

United States college
Track
Track and field in the United States

Track and field, community college